The family Mormoopidae contains bats known generally as mustached bats, ghost-faced bats, and naked-backed bats. They are found in the Americas from the Southwestern United States to Southeastern Brazil.

They are distinguished by the presence of a leaf-like projection from their lips, instead of the nose-leaf found in many other bat species. In some species, the wing membranes join over the animal's back, making it appear hairless. The tail projects only a short distance beyond the membrane that stretches between the hind legs. They are brownish in colour, with short, dense fur. Their dental formula is:

Mormoopid bats roost in caves and tunnels in huge colonies that may include hundreds of thousands of members, producing enough guano to allow commercial mining. They do not hibernate as some other bats do since they live in the tropics. They feed on insects found close to, or on, bodies of water.

Classification
The family consists of two genera, containing around 13 species.

FAMILY MORMOOPIDAE
Genus Mormoops Leach, 1821
Mormoops blainvillii (Leach, 1821) – Antillean ghost-faced bat
Mormoops magna† (Silva-Taboada, 1974) – giant ghost-faced bat
Mormoops megalophylla (Peters, 1864) – ghost-faced bat
Genus Pteronotus Gray, 1838
Subgenus Chilonycteris Gray, 1839
Pteronotus macleayii (Gray, 1839) – Macleay's mustached bat
Pteronotus personatus (Wagner, 1843) – Wagner's mustached bat
Pteronotus quadridens (Gundlach, 1860) – sooty mustached bat
Subgenus Phyllodia Gray, 1843
Pteronotus paraguanensis (Linares & Ojasti, 1974) – Paraguana moustached bat
Pteronotus parnellii (Gray, 1843) – Parnell's mustached bat
Pteronotus pristinus† (Silva-Taboada, 1974) – pristine mustached bat
Subgenus Pteronotus Gray, 1838
Pteronotus davyi (Gray, 1838) – Davy's naked-backed bat
Pteronotus gymnonotus (Natterer, 1843) – big naked-backed bat

References

 
Bat families
Extant Pleistocene first appearances
Taxa named by Henri Louis Frédéric de Saussure